is a Japanese arcade fighting video game player. He specializes in 2D arcade fighting games, mainly those released by Capcom. His longevity is seen as an incredibly rare thing in the world of competitive video games. He currently holds a world record of "the most successful player in major tournaments of Street Fighter" in the Guinness World Records and is a six time Evo Championship Series winner.

Early career
Daigo began going to an arcade game center and playing fighting games as an elementary school student around 10 years of age. Street Fighter II and Fatal Fury: King of Fighters had recently been released and were Daigo's first two fighting games. Street Fighter II often had a very long line with older players, so he began learning Fatal Fury first. After some time and due to the limited time he could stay at the game center, Daigo started challenging other players in Street Fighter II' (Champion Edition) for an opportunity to play even though he felt shy and had to ask for permission. This was when he discovered that he preferred competing with other players.

Around the time when he was a 13-year-old middle school student, Daigo shifted his main game to Vampire Hunter because he thought he was more skilled in that game than in Street Fighter II.  He developed a reputation in Vampire Hunter by setting a 286-win streak record in a single outing before he was forced to leave due to Akihabara Sega (now Club Sega) game center closing for the day. Umehara enrolled in his first tournament when he entered GAMEST Cup's national Vampire Hunter tournament in 1995, losing in the block's finals. His first tournament victory came at his second tournament, GAMEST Cup's national Vampire Savior tournament in 1997, where he defeated Ōnuki (now Nuki) in the finals.

In 1998, at the age of 17 Daigo participated in Capcom's official Street Fighter Zero 3 national tournament and advanced to the finals which took place on a stage in Tokyo Game Show 1998: Autumn on October 11. After winning the tournament by defeating Ōnuki 3-1, Daigo, as the champion, went on to face Alex Valle, the winner of the U.S. national Street Fighter Alpha 3 tournament. The international "Grand Championship" was held in San Francisco, California on November 8. This was Daigo's first trip to the U.S. and his first overseas tournament appearance. The match was best of three games, with five-round games. Daigo came from behind to win 2-1. Both events aired as a 50-minute TV report in Japan.

In September 2001, Daigo's popularity led to the publishing of a mini-autobiography called VERSUS (known as "Umehon" (ウメ本) or "Ume Book" by fans). The book's content is separated into six chapters chronicling the games in which he competes and includes background stories, anecdotes of competitions, and analysis of his opponents.

In 2002, Daigo appeared in a U.S. versus Japan exhibition in Japan. American players competed in four games (Super Street Fighter II Turbo, Street Fighter Alpha 3, Street Fighter III 3rd Strike and Marvel vs. Capcom 2) for the right to battle Japan's best players in those respective games. Umehara only entered the 3rd Strike exhibition, but defeated all of his opponents, ending each round with Ken's fierce Shoryuken. These events were filmed for the documentary Bang the Machine.

In 2003, Daigo won the Super Street Fighter II Turbo tournament in the first Super Battle Opera (Tougeki) and won the same game in Evolution Championship Series when he joined the event for the first time in the same year, making him the first player to win both the SBO and Evolution in the same year on the same game. Umehara also went to Evolution 2004 and Absolution 2004 on April 18 in England and won on SSFII Turbo there.

Daigo has participated regularly in a number of tournaments, appearing in at least one each year since his start in 1997, with a brief hiatus in 2008.

Play style

Throughout his career, Daigo Umehara's main character has been Ryu and his play style based on zoning (keeping the opponent at a specific distance) even though he is also adept in close combat. Since Street Fighter V'''s balance patch in December 2016 that nerfed Ryu to balance the game, Daigo switched to Guile, a charge character. Daigo said, "I don't care if I play a top tier character. I don't need to pick a top tier character, but I want to have a character that can fight the top tiers. It's boring if you go to tournament and you know you're going to run into a really bad match up, it's like 'Oh, I can't win because of the match up'". Hesitating between Urien and Guile, he finally chose the latter, but decided to try Ryu one more time in Topanga League 6 and Final Round 20. His disappointing results (he finished respectively last and 33rd) made him give up on Ryu. Since then, he has continued to play with Guile in spite of a new balance patch that partially restored Ryu in 2017.

Evolution 2004

Despite having never matched off against him before, Umehara was known for having a supposed rivalry with the American Justin Wong due to their differences in gaming philosophies. The two players met each other in the loser's finals of Evo 2004's Street Fighter III: 3rd Strike tournament. Umehara, playing using the character Ken, was down to his last pixel of vitality and any special attack by Wong's Chun-Li, even if guarded, could knock Ken out. Wong attempted to hit his opponent with Chun-Li's "Super Art" move, forcing Umehara to parry 15 attacks in a very short period of time. Umehara did so successfully and went on to counter a final kick of Chun-Li in mid-air before launching a combo move himself and winning the match. Though Umehara lost the grand finals to Kenji Obata, the clip of him parrying Wong's multihit attack became hugely influential and has been compared to famous sports moments such as Babe Ruth's called shot and the Miracle on Ice.

"Evo Moment 37", also known as the "Daigo Parry", is frequently described as the most iconic and memorable moment in the history of competitive video gaming. It was at one point the most-watched competitive gaming moment of all time.

Street Fighter IV era
In July 2008, Umehara came out of retirement and became competitive once again. This time, his focus was on the newly released Street Fighter IV. Because of this, Japanese arcade gaming magazine Arcadia has included a DVD featuring "Umehara Concept Matches" in its January 2009 issue (released on November 29, 2008) and "The God has returned" was stated in Umehara's player introduction part. The DVD contains exhibition matches between him and Japan's 6 top players such as Inoue, Itabashi Zangief, Fuudo, Nemo, and Mago.

2009
On March 5, Umehara made an appearance as the "god of the fighting games world" on the TV show "Gamer's Koshien". He and four other top Japanese players (Soushihan KSK, Itabashi Zangief, Mago, and Tokido) competed with each other and with celebrities in a Street Fighter IV round-robin tournament.

On April 18, at GameStop's Street Fighter IV National Tournament 2009 in San Francisco, California, four players from three countries held exhibition matches following the main competition. Umehara, who came by Capcom's invitation, defeated players Iyo, Poongko and Justin Wong to win the tournament. For the win, he was awarded a free trip to Evolution 2009 in Las Vegas.

Umehara began writing a column in Arcadia called Umehara Column: Michi, starting with the August issue. ("Umehara Column: Street")

Thanks to his win at the GameStop tournament, Umehara entered the Evolution 2009 Street Fighter IV competition as a seeded player in the semi-finals on July 18, which was the second day of the event. In the third and final day, Umehara defeated Justin Wong and placed him in the Losers Bracket, then advanced to the grand finals only to meet Wong again. The two fought until the last game possible, but Umehara ultimately won the competition.

The September issue of Arcadia magazine included a DVD featuring a set of "Umehara's Concept Matches." This was a follow-up to a previous DVD which released in late 2008.

On August 7, Umehara participated in an all night tournament called "GODSGARDEN."

Umehara participated in exhibition matches in a Street Fighter IV competition in Taiwan on October 10. The matches were broadcast live on Famitsu's web channel.

Umehara returned to the United States to join a tournament called Season's Beatings, held October 16–18 in Columbus, Ohio. He won Super Street Fighter II Turbo HD Remix and Street Fighter IV Singles competition.

In a November interview with Simon Parkin, a 28 year old Daigo stated that he felt he was, currently, at his peak as a gamer. He went on to clarify his claim: "My reactions are probably comparable to when I was younger, but I no longer grow agitated when I'm cornered. Nothing can mentally break me anymore; I have mastered nervousness and tension. I can instantly tell opponents apart and categorize them into groups and types according to their personality and weaknesses. As I haven't felt my physical abilities weakening yet, I think I might be at the peak of my career as a fighting gamer."

On November 26, Umehara and five other top Japanese Street Fighter IV players joined a Nico Nico live internet show to talk about the second GODSGARDEN tournament. The show also featured an exhibition match between Umehara and Mago.

2010
Instead of participating in GODSGARDEN #2 (March 6), Umehara flew to France to enter Street Fighter IV tournaments in the World Game Cup gaming event, which took place March 3–7. He placed second in singles and first in 2-on-2.

On April 4, Umehara and two teammates participated in an official Street Fighter IV National Tournament and qualified for the top 14. His team was eliminated, in the quarter finals.

Umehara participated in Capcom's Super Street Fighter IV "Fight Club" launch party in Los Angeles, United States on April 23. Umehara held exhibition matches in which he played various characters including Hakan, Guy, and Dee Jay against a dozen challengers. The event closed with a 3-out-of-5 match between Umehara and Justin Wong, ending in a double-K.O. draw which left Umehara undefeated all night. It was also revealed at the event that Umehara had accepted a sponsorship deal with Mad Catz and would play under their name in future tournaments.

The limited edition of Super Street Fighter IV from the e-CAPCOM store included a special DVD featuring two tournaments between Japan's 8 top players: Umehara, Tokido, Iyo, Shirou, Kin Devu, Momochi, Tokidoki Nukings, and Itabashi Zangief. The Super Street Fighter IV Technical Guide published by Enterbrain which was released on April 28 includes a DVD featuring exhibition matches of the new characters played by Japan's 7 top players: Umehara, Tokido, Kin Devu, Iyo, Momochi, Itabashi Zangief, and Shirou.

On May 9, Umehara appeared on the NHK Sunday night program "MAG-NET" in a feature about Street Fighter.<ref
name=HondaNikki>

</ref>

On May 15, Nico Nico Live held a Super Street Fighter IV online competition where participating online players on Xbox Live got a chance to fight Japan's 3 top players: Umehara, Mago, and Tokido. They also held offline matches and a brief talking segment.

May 29–30, Umehara went to Australia for the first time to participate in Evolution Asia Pacific's Super Street Fighter IV tournament in Sydney. He won the tournament, losing just one game. As the grand prize, he earned a paid flight to Evolution 2010 in Las Vegas where he would start off as a seeded player.

On June 4, Umehara joined the 106th Xbox Live Park online event held by Microsoft Japan with Famitsu's editorial department. During the two-hour event, participating Xbox Live Gold members had the opportunity to chat and face off with Umehara in Super Street Fighter IV online matches.

After getting 2nd place in Nagoya Street Battle 15 (July 4), Umehara joined Evolution 2010 on July 9–11 and faced a tougher challenge than before with over 1,700 players from around the world participating in the Super Street Fighter IV tournament. Nevertheless, Umehara secured a win without ever dropping into the Losers bracket. The live stream of the event set a new record with an approximate 48,000 viewers at its peak across its two channels (Stickam 18,000 and Ustream 30,000).

After winning the qualifier on May 22, Umehara's team participated in the Super Battle Opera 2010 Street Fighter IV finals on September 19 and won second place. The event took place as a part of Tokyo Game Show 2010 at Makuhari Messe International Convention Complex.

Umehara participated in the Season's Beatings tournament in Ohio for the second time October 15–17, the Southern California Regionals tournament in Los Angeles November 6–7, the Canada Cup in Canada November 13–14, and the Northern California Regionals tournament November 20–21. He also attended an exhibition event in Kuwait on November 26.

2012
Umehara published his first book  on April 2, 2012. The book reached the #1 best-selling spot on Amazon Japan's Kindle store.

2013

On April 13, 2013, Daigo attended the New York University Game Center's fourth annual Spring Fighter event as a special guest alongside Seth Killian. At the event, Umehara and Killian held a talk, in which Umehara discussed his life in and out of the Street Fighter scene.

On June 6, 2013, Daigo spoke at the first in a series of seminars hosted by Tohmatsu Innovation Co, Ltd. targeting business executives.

On August 30, 2013, Daigo had a match against the 2013 EVO Champion Xian. The rule was the first to win 10 matches will be declared the winner. Daigo won the match 10-0 against the world Champion Xian.

A couple of months later, in a similar match, Daigo beat Infiltration 10-2.

On November 24, 2013, Daigo held a panel at the DODA career fair where he spoke about his experiences as a professional gamer.

2015
During the Stunfest 2015 final, Daigo managed to pull off an impressive 25-hit combo with Evil Ryu against Ken controlled by Momochi who was the best Ultra Street Fighter IV player of the season according to the Capcom Pro Tour 2015 ranking. The combo thrilled the crowd and was acclaimed by the live french and english commentators. It was selected by Capcom as one of the «Most Hype Moments» of 2015 in a retrospective video. « You could hear the crowd go wild and if you were watching the stream you could see the stream chat go crazy » wrote Capcom in an article, while a french spectator who was in the crowd said that « Daigo's incredible 25-hit combo with Evil Ryu stunned the crowd and the opponent ». Daigo finally won the tournament beating Momochi 3-1, 3-1.

Umehara penned a foreword for the September issue of Japan's Harvard Business Review, with the title "得意なことより好きなことを追求する" ("Tokui na koto yori suki na koto wo tsuikyuu suru"|"Pursue that which you like rather than that at which you excel").

In December 2015, Umehara announced his intentions to donate the entirety of his winnings from the Capcom Pro Tour 2015 Finals, a sum of $60,000, to the Evo Scholarship, a New York University scholarship program which offers financial assistance to students wishing to study game design at the NYU Game Center at the Tisch School of the Arts. The NYU Game Center confirmed the $60,000 donation on January 6, 2016.

Street Fighter V era
2016

The January issue of the Japanese Harvard Business Review featured a twelve-page interview with Umehara entitled, "感情を制するものはゲームを制す" ("Kanjou wo seisuru mono wa game wo seisu"|"He who controls his emotions controls the game.")

In February 2016, Daigo was narrowly defeated by American rapper and music producer Lupe Fiasco in a Street Fighter V exhibition match. The event, organized by former Mad Catz executive Mark Julio, was live streamed to over 75,000 viewers. Several observers noted that Daigo's timing appeared to be off, and that he did not capitalize on key strategic openings during the match.
On April 26, 2016, Daigo held a talk in conjunction with Mizuho bank and medical professor Yoshiki Ishikawa in Osaka, Japan.

In May, 2016, Daigo appeared in the Street Fighter documentary, "格闘ゲームに生きる" (Kakuto geemu ni ikiru | Living the Game), broadcast on WOWOW. Later that month, the documentary was screened at the Hot Docs Film Festival in Toronto, Canada under the name "Living the Game."

On June 1, 2016, Japanese publisher Shogakukan released the book "悩みどころと逃げどころ" (Nayamidokoro to Nigedokoro), a written discussion between Umehara and the popular Japanese blogger Chikirin.

In July 2016, an official English translation of Umehara's first book, The Will to Keep Winning, was sold to Evo attendees as an event exclusive. The book continued to be sold exclusively at fighting game events across the globe throughout the remainder of 2016.

On September 14, 2016, Umehara announced that he had achieved two new World Records recognized by Guinness World Records: "Most views for a competitive fighting game match" (for his famous match against Justin Wong from Evo 2004) and "Highest all-time rank in Ultra Street Fighter IV." Umehara received official recognition for the records via a ceremony held at Tokyo Game Show.

On November 30, 2016, Umehara announced that he had entered a new sponsorship deal with gaming headset maker HyperX.

On December 1, 2016, Red Bull and director Nick McDonald released an eleven-minute documentary on Daigo Umehara entitled, "Mind of a Beast." In the piece, Umehara addressed the pressures of life as a professional gamer, and asserted a distinction between the mythical public figure "Umehara" and the flawed human being, Daigo Umehara.

2017

On January 19, 2017, Daigo gave a two-hour lecture entitled "1日ひとつだけ、強くなる" ("Ichinichi hitotsu dake, tsuyoku naru"|"Getting Stronger Everyday") at the Keio University Marunouchi City Campus. In the lecture, Daigo discussed the ups and downs of carving out a niche as a professional gamer. He spoke to a sold-out audience.

On March 1, 2017, Umehara announced that he had entered another sponsorship with Japanese game developer Cygames, alongside fellow pro fighting gamers Darryl "Snake Eyez" Lewis and Eduardo "PR Balrog" Perez. Together, the three athletes donned the moniker "Cygames Beast," sporting T-shirts with a matching new logo.
From March to May 2017, Umehara participated in the ELEAGUE Street Fighter Invitational, during which he played solely as Guile. Beginning in Group B alongside Snake Eyez and PR Balrog, Umehara pushed his way into the Playoffs, ultimately finishing 8th overall.

On May 27–28, Umehara participated in Red Bull Kumite in Paris, France. He placed 4th overall.

On June 27, Umehara appeared in the Red Bull France-produced documentary, "The Art of Street Fighting" alongside fellow pro gamers Xiao Hai, Gamerbee, Tokido, and Luffy.

On July 14–16, Umehara participated in EVO 2017. After a no-loss sweep in Round 1, he was bumped into the Losers bracket by Haitani during Round 2, and ultimately eliminated during the Semi-Finals by longtime rival Justin Wong.

On July 14, Daigo launched the "Beast" apparel brand in conjunction with apparel makers Nsurgo. The brand is represented by Daigo as well as fellow Cygames-sponsored gamers Snake Eyez and PR Balrog.

2018
On March 10, Daigo was challenged by the EVO champion, Tokido, to a first to 10 Match. Tokido felt very strongly about proving that he was able to beat Daigo. Daigo won 10-5, leaving Tokido frustrated.

On July 22, he won the VSFighting Premier Event in Birmingham (United Kingdom).

 2019 

On June 30, Daigo placed 5th/6th in the CPT Premier tournament at Community Efforts Orlando 2019, where he was eliminated by Fujimura.

On October 27, Daigo placed 7th/8th in the CPT Premier tournament at First Attack 2019, where he was eliminated by JB.

Despite not winning any major tournaments, Daigo's consistent appearance at international CPT events throughout the year was enough to earn him a qualification spot at the 2019 Capcom Cup finals.

At the Capcom Cup 2019 finals, Daigo was eliminated by Tokido with a score of 3-2 in the second round of the tournament, leaving him with a tied 17th-24th place finish to end the 2019 competitive Street Fighter V season.

Books

Manga

"Umehara FIGHTING GAMERS!" is a dramatized manga depiction of Umehara's life as a young participant in the Street Fighter arcade scene, and features several noted players from the Japanese fighting game community. The series is considered a flagship title for its publisher, Kadokawa Shoten, who are actively marketing the series and have confirmed plans to serialize it in their seinen comic magazine Young Ace UP. 
 
The series is illustrated by Kengoro Nishide and written by Saitaru Orika and Maki Tomoi, with Daigo acting as an editorial supervisor.

On July 14, 2017, the English translation of Daigo's manga series, titled Daigo the Beast: Umehara Fighting Gamers,'' debuted with the release of Volume 1 (which compiles the first and second volumes of the Japanese series). The volume, published and translated by Udon Entertainment, was released as an early exclusive for EVO attendees, and is planned for a wider release in December 2017.

Achievements

References

External links
 Daigo Umehara's official homepage 
 Daigo Umehara's Japanese fan site 
 Daigo Umehara related articles on Japanese gaming magazines 

1981 births
Fighting game players
Living people
People from Tokyo
Japanese esports players
Street Fighter players